Academy Prep Center of Tampa is a private middle school housed in the V.M. Ybor building in Ybor City, Florida.

References

Schools in Tampa, Florida
1908 establishments in Florida